Adoption fraud, also known as illegal adoption, can be defined as when a person or institute attempts to either illegally adopt a child or illegally give up a child for adoption. Common ways in which this can be done include dishonesty and bribes.

Prevalence and statistics
It can be quite difficult to obtain accurate statistics concerning adoption fraud. However, according to government statistics, "603 adoptions were recorded by Greece's courts in 2005, an increase of 20 percent over the previous year, according to government statistics. But fewer than 60 of these adoptions were carried out through state channels", meaning that in some regions of the world up to 90% of adoptions have the potential of being illegal.

Prevention and variants
Genetics and other forms of identification may help in convicting and catching those who do adoption fraud. This technology also has the potential to block potential criminals from committing this crime beforehand.

Consequences
In addition to being an offense that carries a felony in many nations (including the United States) adoption fraud is also illegal on an international scale. Perpetrators of this felony may face imprisonment and fines  if they are convicted.

Famous cases
The Adoption of Case No. 6815 Michael Edward Chalek Circuit Court of the 8th Judicial Circuit in and for Alachua County Florida
Scott and Karen Banks - Focus on Children, Utah-Samoa
Others involved: Dan Wakefield
The Adoption of Michelle Riess - New Jersey (1976)
 The Tennessee Children's Home Society, an unlicensed adoption agency used by its longtime director Georgia Tann as a front for black market adoptions. An investigation in 1950 revealed the illegal activities of the Society; Tann died that year before she could be prosecuted. Many celebrities, among them Joan Crawford and the husband-wife pair of Dick Powell and June Allyson, used the Society for their adoptions, but were unaware of the means Tann used to obtain children. Professional wrestling legend Ric Flair was one of the last children adopted through the Society.
The legal kidnapping of James Elliott Rossler by Katherine Sharp. When the birth mother changed her mind during her pregnancy, Katherine Sharp proceeded to adopt "baby Elliott" nearly 3 weeks later. The Bring Baby Elliott Home Facebook page that brought attention to the case was temporarily removed. However, in June 2019, a judge allowed the controversial page to continue. Sharp continues to have interlocutory custody as the case is still pending trial.

Television 
The Dr. Phil Show had an episode revolving around an adoption scam between a couple and single mother. The couple placed an ad on Craigslist to which the scammer immediately replied. The couple was sent fake ultrasounds and fake medical reports, and received money. With the use of technology, the scammer was able to keep the lie about giving the child to them for more than nine months. The episode informed people about signs to look out for when adopting a child, especially when it is not through an adoption agency.

See also
 Human trafficking
 List of international adoption scandals

References

Further reading

Fraud
Adoption